Battles and other military operations that took place on lake or sea ice include:

 about 530 – Battle on the Ice of Lake Vänern, recorded in Norse sagas and referred to in the Anglo-Saxon epic Beowulf
 1241 - Battle of Mohi on the Sajo River
 1242 – Battle on the Ice on Lake Peipus
 1270 – Battle of Karuse on the frozen Baltic Sea between the Island of Muhu and the mainland
 1658 – March Across the Belts, Charles X Gustav's march over the Little Belt and the Great Belt during the Second Northern War
 1795 – Capture of the Dutch fleet at Den Helder: The French First Republic's cavalry captured the fleet of the Dutch Republic that was stuck in ice, frozen at anchor.
 1809 – Finnish War
 Barclay de Tolly's advance from Vaasa to Uumaja in Sweden, see Battle of Ratan and Sävar
 Bagration's and Kulnev's attack from Åland to Grisslehamn in Sweden
 1940 – Battle of Vyborg Bay (1940) in the Winter War
 1941-44 - Road of Life, an ice road over Lake Ladoga that supplied the besieged Leningrad during the winter months (barges kept the supply line open in warmer times), during World War II.
 1942 – Battle of Suursaari in the Continuation War

References

External links 
 Attack Over Ice Feared By Finns – Freezing of Gulf May Open Way for Red Thrust (January 1940)

Ice
Military operations